The Magyar Kupa Final was the final match of the 2013–14 Magyar Kupa, played between Újpest and Diósgyőr.

Route to the final

Match

References

External links
 Official site 

2014
Újpest FC matches
Diósgyőri VTK matches
Association football penalty shoot-outs